Eadie is a surname. Notable people with the surname include:

Alex Eadie (1920–2012), British politician (Labour MP)
Betty Eadie (born 1942), American author
Bill Eadie (born 1947), American wrestler
Bill Eadie (footballer), Scottish footballer
Cindy Eadie (born 1982), Canadian ice hockey goalie
Darren Eadie (born 1975), English footballer
Ellice Eadie (1912–2001), Irish-born British civil servant and solicitor
Graham Eadie (born 1953), an Australian Rugby League footballer
Helen Eadie (1947–2013), British politician (Labour MSP)
Jack Eadie (1888/1889–?), Canadian football player and coach
James Eadie (brewer) (1827–1904), a Scottish brewer 
James Eadie (footballer), Scottish footballer
Jim Eadie (footballer) (born 1947), Scottish footballer
Jim Eadie (politician) (born 1968), Scottish politician (SNP MSP)
John Eadie (1810–1876), Scottish theologian
John Eadie (cricketer) (1861–1923), English cricketer
Ken Eadie (born 1961), Scottish footballer
Nicholas Eadie (born 1958), Australian actor
Ross Eadie, Canadian politician
Sean Eadie (born 1969), Australian track cyclist
Thomas Eadie (1887–1974), United States Navy officer, recipient of the Medal of Honor
Thomas Wardrope Eadie (1898–1986), Canadian businessman
William Eadie (cricketer) (1864–1914), English cricketer
William Eadie (footballer) (1882–1915), Scottish footballer
Hugh Eadie (Alderman) (1647-1697), Politician during the Siege of Derry 1689-90